= Waghawade =

- Village
- Location in Karnataka, India Waghawade (India)
- Coordinates: 15°45′22″N 74°27′50″E
- Country: India
- State: Karnataka
- District: Belgaum
- Talukas: Belgaum

Languages
  - Official: Kannada
- Time zone: UTC+5:30 (IST)

Waghawade is a village in Belgaum district in the southern state of Karnataka, India.
